The , officially the 2013 All Japan Adults Football Tournament, and most known as the 2013 Shakaijin Cup,  was the 49th edition of the annually contested single-elimination tournament (or cup) for non-league clubs.

Calendar

Schedule

Round of 32

Round of 16

Quarter-finals

Semi-finals

Third place match

Final

References

See also
2013 J.League Division 1
2013 J.League Division 2
2013 Japan Football League
2013 Japanese Regional Leagues
2013 Emperor's Cup
2013 J.League Cup

2013 in Japanese football